The  Communist Review  is a defunct Australian magazine that was published in varying frequencies and formats from 1934 to 1966, in Sydney, New South Wales, Australia.

History
The Communist Review was first published on 13 March 1934, as the official organ of the Communist Party of Australia. The magazine was published continuously through to 1966. However, the paper was published in a variety of different sizes and formats, and several editions during 1941 were issued as typescript duplicates. When the Communist Party of Australia was made illegal by the government of Robert Menzies during 1951, the publication of the magazine continued unabated. Publication of the magazine was eventually ceased after it was replaced by the Australian Left Review, which at the time was considered to have a more accessible political agenda.

Digitisation
The various editions of the paper have been digitised as part of the Australian Newspapers Digitisation Program, a project hosted by the National Library of Australia.

See also
 List of magazines in Australia

References

External links
 

1934 establishments in Australia
1966 disestablishments in Australia
Communist magazines
Defunct political magazines published in Australia
Magazines established in 1934
Magazines disestablished in 1966
Magazines published in Sydney